The Hireling is a 1973 British drama film directed by Alan Bridges, based on a 1957 novel of the same title by L. P. Hartley, which starred Robert Shaw and Sarah Miles. It tells the story of a chauffeur who falls in love with an aristocratic woman.

It shared the Grand Prix with Scarecrow at the 1973 Cannes Film Festival. Sarah Miles received a Special Jury Prize for her performance as Lady Franklin.

Plot

Set in and around Bath, Somerset immediately after the First World War, the story opens at an expensive mental clinic in the country where the young and recently widowed Lady Franklin is being discharged. The owner of a smart hire car, former sergeant-major Ledbetter, chauffeurs her to her unsympathetic mother in Bath. Hired to take her on outings, he becomes the only person she can talk to as she slowly lifts out of deep depression.

When he takes her to a boxing night at a boys club that he helps to run, she meets another committee member, the young former officer Cantrip. Like Ledbetter he is struggling to return to normal, in his case politics, after his traumatic experiences in the war. Cantrip starts wooing the wealthy Lady Franklin while still sleeping with his lover Connie, who is probably a war widow.

Ledbetter's mental equilibrium becomes progressively more fragile. His business is failing, his casual relationship with the waitress Doreen brings no joy, his deepening affection for Lady Franklin is no longer returned and his rage against his more successful rival is intensified by Cantrip's concealed involvement with Connie.

When he finally confronts Cantrip and Lady Franklin together, they tell him that he has no place in their lives because they have become engaged. Leaping into his Rolls-Royce and swigging frequently from a bottle of alcohol, he drives blindly back to his garage and proceeds to run amok in the little courtyard, driving heedlessly back and forth into the walls and reversing and on and on like an animal in a frenzy in a cage.

Cast
 Robert Shaw as Steven Ledbetter
 Sarah Miles as Lady Franklin
 Peter Egan as Captain Hugh Cantrip
 Caroline Mortimer as Connie
 Elizabeth Sellars as Lady Franklin's mother
 Ian Hogg as Davis
 Christine Hargreaves as Doreen
 Lyndon Brook as Doctor
 Patricia Lawrence as Mrs. Hansen
 Petra Markham as Edith

Themes

Loneliness is the first main theme of the film and with it the profound effects on mental balance of bereavement and post-combat stress. All three principals are desperately lonely and insecure. While Lady Franklin had isolation and medical treatment at the clinic, both Ledbetter and Cantrip are fighting the traumas of the war on their own. Neither man finds the woman he occasionally sleeps with satisfactory. As Cantrip and Lady Franklin discover a sort of love together, Ledbetter's increasingly unstable life unravels.

The second main theme is class and money. Lady Franklin, widow of a baronet, has a large country house and a comfortable income. Cantrip's life is considerably more precarious but by marrying a rich and socially superior woman he will enter the landed gentry. Ledbetter, a working class man with no capital who rose as far as he was likely to get in the army, in civilian life ranks little above a cab driver.

Reception

Grand Prix at the 1973 Cannes Film Festival.

Special Jury Prize awarded to Sarah Miles.

"France-Soir said: 'The acting in the English film "The Hireling" has been the best seen during the festival. Sarah Miles and Robert Shaw are magnificent.

"Unseen last week when I listed the five best films thus far of 1973 but which I most emphatically want to add to the list are: 'THE HIRELING'."

"...here we are just barely into the last half of 1973 and already in the past two weeks I've named nine films I think will end up on My TEN BEST list come December."

Natasha Kroll won the BAFTA for art direction in 1974 for her work on The Hireling.

I thought "The Hireling," that won the prize over my film in Cannes, was sentimental muck. Do they think they're being subtle because Sarah Miles never goes to bed with her chauffeur? ...That is not sour grapes. ...And I don't think "The Hireling" will be as successful as my film at the box-office. You can fool the critics but you can't fool the public. – Lindsay Anderson on not winning for O Lucky Man! at Cannes.

"If The Hireling did have to be viewed in political terms it would certainly misfire. ...Fortunately,  Bridges allows us to see both Shaw and Miles as human beings... Sarah Miles, in fact, though her role would seem to allow only a narrow range of expression, gives by far the finest performance of her career."

THE HIRELING' (could easily win an Oscar nomination for Sarah Miles if–and this is a big IF! – her personal popularity at least as I understand it, doesn't eliminate her)."

Joyce Haber, of the Los Angeles Times wrote, "Special Categories – Worst Performances by Any Female Star: Sarah Miles for 'Cat Dancing' and 'The Hireling'."

Stanley Kauffmann called The Hireling, "an unrecognized, masterly work of art.

"...a fastidious attention to detail, an almost documentary precision, ...studded with objects evocative of a lost age."

"The director - that impressionable Liverpool child - is Alan Bridges. ...What appealed to Bridges about 'The Hireling', which starred Sarah Miles as an aristocratic young widow and Robert Shaw as her chauffeur, was the violent deceptions upon which their relationship was based."

"The results are haunting - thanks to an unusually subtle script and fine performances from all concerned."

"Robert Shaw, Sarah Miles, Elizabeth Sellars and a first-rate cast take dead aim at the British class system in a withering adaptation of the L.P. Hartley novel about a chauffeur who helps draw an upper-class woman out of her chronic depression in the mistaken impression she loves him."

"Robert Shaw plays a chauffeur who helps an upper-class woman (Sarah Miles) out of a mental depression, but mistakenly assumes she is interested in him. Rated three stars."

References

External links

 

1973 films
1970s historical drama films
British historical drama films
Films based on British novels
Films directed by Alan Bridges
Palme d'Or winners
Films scored by Marc Wilkinson
Films set in Bath, Somerset
Columbia Pictures films
Films with screenplays by Wolf Mankowitz
1973 drama films
1970s English-language films
1970s British films